Ethmia jingdongensis is a moth in the family Depressariidae. It was described by Wang and Zheng in 1997. It is found in China.

References

Moths described in 1997
jingdongensis